Magnus Bakken (born 1991) is a Norwegian jazz saxophonist and composer. He was born in Lillehammer.

Discography

Solo albums 
 2015: Cycles (AMP Music & Records), with Magnus Bakken Quartet featuring George Garzone

Collaborations 
 With Ninjabeat
 2016: The Waiting Game (AMP Music & Records)

Nordic Circles
 2017: Under The Clouds (AMP Music & Records)

References

External links

21st-century Norwegian saxophonists
Norwegian jazz saxophonists
Norwegian jazz composers
Musicians from Lillehammer
1991 births
Living people